These are the opinion polls conducted to measure preferences in the 2019 Philippine Senate election.

Polls

SWS and Pulse Asia

References

Opinion polling in the Philippines
2019 Philippine general election